Pierre-Hugues Herbert and Nicolas Mahut were the defending champions, but chose not to defend their title.

Jérémy Chardy and Henri Kontinen won the title, defeating Jean-Julien Rojer and Horia Tecău in the final, 7–6(7–5), 7–6(7–4).

Seeds

Draw

Draw

Qualifying

Seeds

Qualifiers
  Sander Arends /  David Pel

Lucky losers

Qualifying draw

References
 Main Draw
 Qualifying Draw

Doubles